Nungambakkam is a locality in downtown Chennai, India. The neighborhood abounds with multi-national commercial establishments, important government offices, foreign consulates, educational institutions, shopping malls, sporting facilities, tourist spots, star hotels, restaurants, and cultural centers. Nungambakkam is also a prime residential area in Chennai. The adjoining regions of Nungambakkam include Egmore, Chetpet, T. Nagar, Kodambakkam and Choolaimedu.

History 

Nungambakkam is one of the oldest parts of Chennai. It formed the western limits of Madras until the 1960s, and it was part of Madras since the 18th century. 

According to K.V. Raman's The Early History of the Madras Region, Nungambakkam features in an 11th-century CE copper plate pertaining to Rajendra Chola.

According to the Chennai Corporation's records, Nungambakkam village, which was under a Mughal firman, was handed over to the British along with four other villages (Tiruvatiyoor, Kathiwakam, Vyasarpady and Sathangadu) in 1708.  These five villages were hence forward known as the 'Five New Towns'. Since then, Nungambakkam has been a part of Madras city.  Public buildings and colleges rose in the 1850s. 

In the early part of the 20th century, Nungambakkam rose as one of the upper-class European residential areas, housing civil servants and influential members of the city administration.  The 1911 Encyclopædia Britannica records the presence of vast empty spaces and parks in Nungambakkam. Most of Nungambakkam's principal lanes, such as College Road, Haddows Road and Sterling Road, are over 100 years old and appear in a 1909 map of Madras city. Sterling Road consists of trees in both the sides, which is very rare to see in the heart of a metropolitan city.  Pizza Hut, Pizza Corner, Mexicano Griller, Maplai Restaurant, Coffee day Lounge, Goddy's, World of Titan, KFC, Reebok, NIKE, ADIDAS, Marrybrown, Just Born, Chicking, BASICS etc. all have opened their shops in Nungambakkam. Traffic is very high in Nungambakkam during peak hours (8am-11am & 6pm-9.30pm) due to various road junctions which connects some important places in Chennai city.  There are a lot of ATMs and branches of various international banks such as Standard Chartered, Deutsche Bank etc..

The Women's Christian College was established in 1915. The Good Shepherd Convent later known as the Good Shephered Higher Secondary Matriculation School was established in 1925. Loyola College was established as an arts college in 1925.

Localities
The subdivisions of Nungambakkam include Mahalingapuram, Lake area, pushpa nagar, Sterling road, College road, Shenoy road and Haddows road.

Three out of the city's four prime residential areas; Wallace Gardens, Khader Nawaz Khan Road and Kothari Road, are in Nungambakkam.

Good Shepherd Higher Secondary Matriculation school, Loyola College, MOP Vaishnav college, SDAT Tennis Stadium, Mexicano Griller, Ispahani Center, Women's Christian College, GG Hospitals, SIMS Hospital, PERS Enterprises Pvt LTD Childs Trust Hospital and Padma Seshadri Bala Bhavan are some of the city's prominent landmarks.  The SDAT stadium hosts the long-running ATP event, the Chennai Open. Valluvar Kottam, dedicated to the Tamil Saint-Poet Thiruvalluvar (திருவள்ளுவர் in Tamil), is a popular tourist attraction in Chennai.

Nungambakkam is also the Occidental cultural district of Chennai, being home to the Alliance Française and Max Mueller Bhavan.  It is also home to many expensive western fashion boutiques and malls.

The Regional Passport Office of Chennai is located on Haddows Road, Nungambakkam. This office issues passports to half of Tamil Nadu. Nungambakkam is also home to the Austrian, Canadian and South Korean consulates in Chennai as well as the British Deputy High Commission.
Mahalingapuram Sree Ayyappa Temple

Mahalingapuram Ayyappan - Guruvayurappan Temple conducted its Kumbhabhishekam, for which the high priests of the Sabarimal Temple performed the Ashtabandha Kalasham.

About four decades ago, there existed in the Chennai Metropolis no temple dedicated exclusively to Lord Ayyappa. In the absence of any institutionalized service, devotees proceeding to Sabarimala during the Mandalam-Makaravilakku seasons had to fend for themselves. Indeed, Ayyappan Vilakku used to be conducted in several areas of the city as an annual feature, enlisting the support of local devotees. One such area was Nungambakkam.

Educational institutions in and around Nungambakkam are
 Sri krishnaswamy matriculation higher secondary school
 Loyola College
 Good Shephered Higher Secondary Matriculation School
 MOP Vaishnav College
 Women's Christian College
 Vidyodaya Matriculation School 
 Padma Seshadri Bala Bhavan
 Panimalar Polytechnic College
 Pearl Academy of Fashion Management
 Institute of Computer Accountants
 IEC Technologies
 Liba Informatic Center
 Vicapri Labs

Nungambakkam has the police station of assistant commissioner. It also has the Nungambakkam railway station and the major bus routes 17D, 17E, 17k, 27H, 27L, 37C, 37D, 37E, 37G, A47, 47, 47A, 47D, 147A, 147B, 147C, 147M, 147N, and 147S

It has two major subdivision:
Pushpa Nagar
Sterling Road

The major temples in Nungambakkam are:

 Agatheeswarar temple
 Asalathamman temple
 Aadipureeswarar temple
 Prasanna venkatesha perumal temple
 Selva Vinayagar temple
 Devi Karmaari Amman temple
 Sree Ayappan-Guruvayurappan temple
 Mahalingeswarar temple
 Thandumariamman temple

Transport
Nungambakkam is well connected to other parts of the city. Many of the state-run Metropolitan Transport Corporation buses run through Nungambakkam. Nungambakkam has its own Suburban Train Station on the Chennai Beach - Tambaram Railway Station railway line, which connects it to other parts of the city.

The Nungambakkam station is among the top three EMU stations, along with Chromepet and St. Thomas Mount, in terms of the number of persons who use the facilities on the Chennai Beach-Tambaram section every day.

References

External links

Neighbourhoods in Chennai
Cities and towns in Chennai district